The 2013–14 season was Notts County Football Club's 125th year in the Football League and their fourth consecutive season in Football League One, the third division of the English League System.

League One data

League table

Result summary

Result by round

Kit

|
|

Squad

Statistics

|-
!colspan=14|Players who left the club:

|}

Captains

Goalscorers

Disciplinary record

Suspensions served

Contracts

Transfers

In

Loans in

Out

Loans out

Fixtures & results

Friendlies

League One

FA Cup

League Cup

League Trophy

Overall summary

Summary

Score overview

References

Notts County F.C. seasons
Notts County